Gagea juliae, the yellow star-of-Cyprus, is a plant species in the lily family, native to Cyprus and southern Turkey.

Gagea juliae is a bulbous perennial herb with erect stems 2–20 cm high. Flowers yellow internally with a broad greenish stripe externally on each perianth segment. Flowering February–April.

Habitat 
On damp shaded  hillsides in garigue, by roadsides or in moist rock crevices or in pine forest at 50–1650 m altitude.

Distribution
Native to Cyprus and southern Turkey, it is found in Akamas, Ayia, Stavros Psokas, Tripylos the Troödos forest, Platres, Ayios Theodoros (Adelphi Forest), the Makhera and Limassol Forests, Kellaki, Pentadaktylos, Yialousa.

References

External links
 The Plant List
 Diomedia color photo
 Mediterranean Garden Society Forum color photo
 Alamy Stock Photo - Gagea juliae endemic Flower  color photo

juliae
Flora of Turkey
Flora of Cyprus
Plants described in 1904